Şemsi Ahmet Pasha also known as Chamsi-Pasha (b. 1492 d. April 28, 1580) was a prominent Ottoman statesman of Albanian origin  who occupied numerous high-ranking political posts, serving at different stages as the Ottoman governor of Damascus, Rûm, Sivas, Anatolia and Rumelia, and subsequently succeeding Sokollu Mehmet Pasha as grand vizier of the Ottoman Empire in 1579.

Life
Paternally, he was an Albanian. His mother's origin is unknown but it was claimed that she was a direct descendant of Khalid ibn al-Walid (sayyida), the celebrated Muslim general, probably in order to increase his own prestige. His wife was the granddaughter of the Ottoman Sultan Suleiman I, Ayşe Hümaşah Sultan, daughter of Suleiman's only daughter Mihrimah Sultan. By her he had five sons and five daughters.

Raised in the Imperial residence of the period, Topkapı Palace, as Grand Vizier, he charged renowned court architect Mimar Sinan with the task of building a mosque and adjoining complex near his main seat, the Şemsi Pasha Palace on the Bosphorus shoreline in Constantinople. The Şemsi Pasha Mosque is one of the smallest mosques to be commissioned by a Grand Vizier, and yet it is one of the most well-known mosques in city, due to a combination of its miniature dimensions and its waterfront location. It is mentioned as a chief example of Mimar Sinan's skill in organically blending architecture with the natural landscape.

During Şemsi Pasha's tenure as the beylerbey (governor-general) of Rumelia, it was reported that he left the capital for Sofia in 1565 with such pomp that the people of Constantinople who watched the spectacle of his lavishly clad retinue had never seen a beylerbey display such 'majesty and grandeur.'

Issue 
By Ayşe Hümaşah Sultan, he had ten children, five sons and five daughters:

Sons
 Sultanzade Abdurrahman Bey, (died 1596)-97, buried in Mihrimah Sultan Mosque), married a daughter of Cığalazade Yusuf Sinan Pasha, and had a son, Semiz Mehmed Pasha;
 Sultanzade Mehmed Bey (died 1593), sanjak-bey of Herzegovina; 
 Sultanzade Şehid Mustafa Pasha (died 1593), sanjak-bey of Klis;
 Sultanzade Osman Bey (died 1590–91, buried in Mihrimah Sultan Mosque), sanjak-bey of Şebinkarahisar;
Sultanzade Mahmud Pasha († 1602 buried in the Mihrimah Sultan Mosque) Sanjak-bey of Kastamonu and Nakhchivan sanjak-bey of Şebinkarahisar;.

Daughters
 Saliha Hanımsultan (1561–1580) married in October 1576 to Cığalazade Yusuf Sinan Pasha. Mihrimah Sultan spent 70.000 gold coins for her wedding. She had a son and a daughter. 
Safiye Hanımsultan, married in March 1581 to Cığalazade Yusuf Sinan Pasha after her sister's death in 1580. She had two sons and a daughter. 
Hatice Sultan, married Kapıcıbaşı Mahmud Bey in December 1584
Ayşe Hanımsultan. Probably she died in infancy. 
Fülane Hanımsultan, married in March 1596 to Yemenli Hasan Pasha.

See also
 Şemsi Pasha Mosque
 List of Ottoman Grand Viziers
 List of Ottoman governors of Damascus

References

Sources
 Kuran, Aptullah. 1986. Mimar Sinan. Istanbul: Hürriyet Vakıf Yayınları, p. 193–196.
 Gültekin, Gülbin. 1994. "Semsi Pasa Külliyesi." In Dünden Bugüne Istanbul Ansiklopedisi. Istanbul: Tarih Vakfi, VII, p. 158–159.
 Necipoglu, Gülru. 2005. The Age of Sinan: Architectural Culture in the Ottoman Empire. London: Reaktion Books, p. 452–498.

Pashas
16th-century Grand Viziers of the Ottoman Empire
Albanian Pashas
Albanian Grand Viziers of the Ottoman Empire
1492 births
1580 deaths
Military personnel of the Ottoman Empire
Albanian military personnel
Albanians from the Ottoman Empire
16th-century military personnel